Jeff Harding is an American actor from Andover, Massachusetts, who attended college in Brunswick, Maine. He is best known as an audiobook narrator for works like The Da Vinci Code, The Bourne Identity, Kane and Abel and Secrets Of The Code.  As an actor, he has appeared in films like The Razor's Edge (1984), Spies Like Us (1985), Hackers (1995), Tomorrow Never Dies (1997), Alfie (2004) and De-Lovely (2004).

A United Kingdom resident since the 1970s, he has appeared in British comedies like The Armando Iannucci Shows, The Fast Show and Father Ted and in the 1980s BBC drama series Howards' Way. On The Fast Show, Harding's sketches often involved nothing more than his character saying "Hi, I'm Ed Winchester" to camera in the style of a TV news reporter. He also appeared in the 1990s remake of The Tomorrow People as General Damon. He dubbed "Felidae" In 1994

In the BBC docudrama series Seven Wonders of the Industrial World he played chief engineer John Frank Stevens in the episode dedicated to the building of the Panama Canal.

He guest-starred in the CW series Life is Wild in the episode "Open for Business". He voices Vincent Meis in the video game The Witcher and guest-starred in the CBBC series The Basil Brush Show in 2003 in the episode Fit for Nothing, playing Healthy Harry.  In the 1990s he provided voice-overs for many Dorling Kindersley CD-ROMs.

Before his film and television work, he taught in Morocco and later became a master carpenter at the Palace Theatre.

Partial filmography

Rupan sansei (1978) – Flinch (1996 Manga dub) (English version, voice, uncredited)
Ragtime (1981) – Policeman No. 13
Space Riders (1984) – Mike Lockwood
Scream for Help (1984) – Policeman #4
The Razor's Edge (1984) – Brian Ryan
The Dirty Dozen: Next Mission (1985, TV Movie) – Sanders
The Aviator (1985) – Carson
Blood Tracks (1985) – John
Spies Like Us (1985) – Fitz-Hume's Associate
The American Way (1986) – Doug
The Last Days of Patton (1986, TV Movie) – West Point Professor
Love Potion (1987) – Gerald
A Time of Destiny (1988) – Sergeant
Patlabor: The Movie (1989) – Pilot (1995) (English version, voice, uncredited)
Murder Story (1989) – Larry Deleo
Bullseye! (1990) – Agent Merrow
The Runner (1992) – Radio Announcer
Hackers (1995) – 2nd V.P.
Ekkusu (1996) – Kusangi Shiyuu (English version, voice)
Tomorrow Never Dies (1997) – Newsreader (uncredited)
RPM (1998) – Tim Ryan
The Misadventures of Margaret (1998) – Man at Party
De-Lovely (2004) – Cody
Alfie (2004) – Phil
The White Countess (2005) – Company Director
The Battersea Ripper (2006)
Alien Autopsy (2006) – CIA Agent
The Kovak Box (2006) – Gerente Sanatorio

External links

Audiobook narrators
American male television actors
Living people
Year of birth missing (living people)
American emigrants to England
American expatriates in England